William Hulett was born in Havre, Montana on May 21, 1982. He moved to Las Vegas, Nevada in late 2000. Since moving to Las Vegas he has performed numerous shows on the Las Vegas Strip and been in several national commercials. He was a winner of Fear Factor 10/11/04. He starred in a reality show produced by Ryan Seacrest called Paradise City in 2006. From 2007 he has performed in the "sensual" side of Cirque du Soleil, Zumanity.

References 

1982 births
Living people
Participants in American reality television series
People from Havre, Montana
People from the Las Vegas Valley